Stéphane Mbia Etoundi (born 20 May 1986) is a Cameroonian professional footballer who plays as a defensive midfielder or defender.

He played 179 games and scored nine goals in Ligue 1 over nine seasons playing for Rennes, Marseille and Toulouse. He spent two years at Sevilla, winning the Europa League in both.

Mbia played for Cameroon 68 times from 2005 to 2016 and scored five goals for the national team. He was included in the squads for the 2008 Olympics, two Africa Cup of Nations tournaments and two FIFA World Cups.

Club career

Rennes
Born in Yaoundé, Mbia made his debut for the Rennes first team during the 2005–06 season, going on to make a handful of appearances over the campaign. The Cameroonian scored his first Ligue 1 goal in November 2006 against the incumbent French champions Lyon.

On 18 April 2007, Mbia was abused by Lyon player Milan Baroš. This led to disciplinary action being taken against Baroš by the French Football Federation, who banned the striker for three matches.

Marseille
On 14 July 2009, Mbia completed his £10.4 million move to Marseille from Rennes, going on to play a vital role in Marseille's victorious Ligue 1 campaign that season, starting off as a defensive midfielder but later making the transition to the role of centre back alongside former Charlton Athletic player Souleymane Diawara. His redeployment at centre back was a success and he went on to play the rest of the season in this position, where he was considered to be one of the best performers in Didier Deschamps' talented squad, as he formed a formidable defensive partnership with Diawara.

Queens Park Rangers
On 31 August 2012 Mbia signed a two-year deal with English Premier League club Queens Park Rangers, signing for an undisclosed fee, with Joey Barton heading in the opposite direction on a season-long loan.

On 27 October 2012, Mbia was sent off seventeen minutes from the end of only his fourth league appearance for QPR, a 1–0 defeat to Arsenal at the Emirates Stadium. He was dismissed in the 79th minute for violent conduct after kicking Gunners defender Thomas Vermaelen in retaliation to a strong challenge that had left Mbia floored. He received the standard three-match ban from the FA, and became ineligible for QPR's league games against Reading, Stoke City and Southampton. On 6 May 2013, Mbia tweeted to Joey Barton, asking him if he would like to switch seats with him at Marseille in hinting that he wanted to leave Queen Park Rangers after they were relegated from the Premier League. In July 2013 Mbia scored his first goal for the club in a pre-season friendly against Southend United and expressed desire to stay at QPR.

Sevilla

On 26 August 2013, Mbia was loaned out to Spanish La Liga club Sevilla FC for the rest of the season. Mbia made his Sevilla debut on 1 September, providing an assist for Kevin Gameiro's first goal in a 2–2 draw with Málaga CF. On 27 October, Mbia provided assists for both Ivan Rakitić and Jairo Samperio as Sevilla overcame 10-man Osasuna 2–1. His first goal in La Liga came in the Seville derby against Real Betis on 24 November, heading in Sevilla's second goal in a 4–0 win.

Mbia scored with a back-heel in the first leg of their Europa League semi-final against compatriots Valencia CF on 24 April 2014 in a 2–0 home win. In the second leg on 1 May, he scored the winning away goal with a header in the fourth minute of added time to take Sevilla into the final. Sevilla subsequently won the final in a shootout against Benfica at the Juventus Stadium in Turin on 14 May, with Mbia converting his penalty kick after the match had ended 0—0. On 3 June, Mbia was selected in the 18-man Europa League "Team of the Year" along with teammates Ivan Rakitić, Nicolás Pareja and Beto. At the LFP Awards, he was a nominee for the league's best African player, alongside the Granada CF duo of Yacine Brahimi and Youssef El-Arabi.

On 31 August 2014, Mbia rejoined Sevilla on permanent basis. He scored his first goal of the new season on 18 September, heading in a cross from Gerard Deulofeu as Sevilla started the defense of their Europa League title with a 2–0 win over Feyenoord. Mbia netted a brace as Sevilla earned a comfortable 4–1 victory over Deportivo de La Coruña at the Ramon Sanchez Pizjuan stadium on 5 October.

On 27 May 2015, Mbia started for Sevilla in the 2015 UEFA Europa League Final defeat of FC Dnipro at Poland's National Stadium, thus retaining their Europa League crown, and qualifying the team for next season's Champions League

Later career
On 2 July 2015, Mbia joined Trabzonspor on a free transfer, signing a three-year deal.

On 29 January 2016, Mbia signed for Chinese Super League club Hebei China Fortune. In March 2018, he left the club by mutual consent.

In August 2018, Mbia joined Ligue 1 side Toulouse FC on a season-long contract. He left the club in January 2019.

On 3 February 2019, Mbia returned to China to join top-flight newcomers Wuhan Zall. A year later, he moved across the league to Shanghai Greenland Shenhua. He left after one season to re-join Wuhan Zall, now renamed Wuhan F.C., and reunited with his former Sevilla team-mate Daniel Carriço.

On 31 August 2021, Mbia returned to Spain after six years, and joined CF Fuenlabrada in Segunda División on a one-year deal. The following 21 January, he left the club after alleging "personal problems".

International career

Mbia has played international football at junior level for Cameroon. He was part of the Cameroon squad that competed in the 2003 FIFA U-17 World Championship in Finland, where his side were eliminated at the group stage.

He made his debut for the full Cameroon national team in 2005. He was part of the squad which were runners up at the 2008 Africa Cup of Nations in Ghana, where he scored twice in a 3–2 win against Tunisia in the quarter-finals.

Mbia was part of the Cameroon squad for the 2008 Olympics in China, playing in all four of his team's matches, and scoring once against Honduras. Mbia was also selected to represent Cameroon at the 2010 Africa Cup of Nations in Angola and the World Cup in South Africa.

On 2 June 2014, Mbia was included by Cameroon manager Volker Finke in the final 23-man squad for the World Cup in Brazil. The team were eliminated after losing all of their group games amidst a bonuses dispute that led to Mbia replacing Samuel Eto'o as captain of the national team.

Personal life
Mbia is the older brother of footballer Franck Etoundi, who was also a Cameroonian international.

Career statistics

Club
.

International goals

Honours

Club
Rennes
 UEFA Intertoto Cup: 2008

Marseille
 Ligue 1: 2009–10
 Coupe de la Ligue: 2009–10, 2010–11, 2011–12
 Trophée des Champions: 2011

Sevilla
 UEFA Europa League: 2013–14, 2014–15

International
Cameroon
Africa Cup of Nations runner-up:2008

Individual
 Africa Cup of Nations Team of the Tournament: 2008
 CAF Team of the Year: 2014
 UEFA Europa League Squad of the season: 2013–14, 2014–15

References

External links

 
 
 Stade Rennais profile
 
 

1986 births
Living people
Footballers from Yaoundé
Association football midfielders
Cameroonian footballers
Cameroon international footballers
Ligue 1 players
Premier League players
La Liga players
Süper Lig players
Chinese Super League players
Segunda División players
Kadji Sports Academy players
Stade Rennais F.C. players
Queens Park Rangers F.C. players
Olympique de Marseille players
Sevilla FC players
Trabzonspor footballers
Hebei F.C. players
Toulouse FC players
Wuhan F.C. players
Shanghai Shenhua F.C. players
CF Fuenlabrada footballers
Footballers at the 2008 Summer Olympics
Olympic footballers of Cameroon
2008 Africa Cup of Nations players
2010 Africa Cup of Nations players
2015 Africa Cup of Nations players
2010 FIFA World Cup players
2014 FIFA World Cup players
Expatriate footballers in France
Cameroonian expatriate footballers
Expatriate footballers in England
Expatriate footballers in Spain
Expatriate footballers in China
Cameroonian expatriate sportspeople in France
Cameroonian expatriate sportspeople in England
Cameroonian expatriate sportspeople in Spain
Cameroonian expatriate sportspeople in Turkey
Cameroonian expatriate sportspeople in China
UEFA Europa League winning players